The Prinz-Heinrich-Fahrt (Prince Heinrich Tour, also known as Prince Henry Tour), named after Prince Albert Wilhelm Heinrich of Prussia, was a motorcar contest held from 1908 to 1911 and a precursor to the German Grand Prix. The brother of Emperor Wilhelm II, who had staged a Kaiserpreis for motorcars in 1907 (and for other sports also), was a motoring enthusiast and inventor.

Only production touring cars with four seats and three passengers were admitted, no specially made racing cars. 
The trophy for the winner was a model car made of 13.5 kg of silver.  

Ferdinand Porsche himself won in 1910.

The last event was in 1911, not as contest, but as a touristic event.

See also 
 Vauxhall Prince Henry, a production replica of a British car entered in the 1910 trial

External links 
 Three small NSU cars finish in 1909
 Ferdinand Porsche returns home after his 1910 win

Auto races in Germany